Unit of measure most commonly refers to units of measurement in weights and measures.

Unit of measure may also refer to:
 Unit of account, a monetary unit of measure in economics
 Unit of Measure (album), a 2000 album by Tony Rice